Galeai Moaaliitele Tuufuli (c. 1937 – October 24, 2018) was an American Samoan politician.

Biography 
Tuufuli taught at the American Samoa Community College from 1976 to 1982. He also served as the police commissioner from 1985 to 1992. Tuufuli was a paramount chief and served in the American Samoa Senate for the Manu'a District, American Samoa in the late 1990's. He was re-elected to the Senate in 2008, and re-elected in December 2012, for the 2013-2017 term. He was re-elected in November 2016 for the 2017-2021 term.

In 2017 he was given an award as the longest-serving government employee. He died at St. Rose Hospital in Hayward, California at age 81.

Legacy
The Afioga Galeai Moaaliitele Tuufuli Central Police Station in Pago Pago is named in his honour.

Notes

1937 births
2018 deaths
American Samoan chiefs
American Samoan politicians
American Samoa Senators